The Tai Po River is a river in Tai Po, New Territories, Hong Kong.

It has many tributaries, with most coming from the Ta Tit Yan, Grassy Hill, Lead Mine Pass and Yuen Tun Ha area. The tributaries gradually merge as the Tai Po River, which parallels Tolo Highway until Tai Po Market station, where it turns north to meet the Lam Tsuen River.

History
Before the 1970s, the Tai Po River flowed straight into Tolo Harbour near Tai Po Market station. However, due to the pressing need for development land in the then new town of Tai Po, the land was reclaimed, and the Tai Po River lengthened northwards to flow into the Lam Tsuen River before it enters Tolo Harbour.

See also
List of rivers and nullahs in Hong Kong

References
2006. Hong Kong Driving Guide. Universal Publications Ltd. 
 This article contains information translated from the corresponding article in Chinese Wikipedia.

External links

Rivers of Hong Kong, in Chinese

Rivers of Hong Kong
Tai Po